Blacks Creek is a  long 2nd order tributary to Allen Creek in Pittsylvania County, Virginia.

Course 
Blacks Creek rises in Renan, Virginia in Pittsylvania County and then flows southeast to join Allen Creek about 1 miles southwest of Hermosa.

Watershed 
Blacks Creek drains  of area, receives about 45.2 in/year of precipitation, has a wetness index of 405.09, and is about 55% forested.

See also 
 List of Virginia Rivers

References 

Rivers of Virginia
Rivers of Pittsylvania County, Virginia
Tributaries of the Roanoke River